Extrinsic finality is a principle of the philosophy of teleology that holds that a being has a final cause or purpose external to that being itself, in contrast to an intrinsic finality, or self-contained purpose.
One example is the view that minerals are "designed" to be used by plants that are in turn "designed" to be used by animals.

Over-emphasizing extrinsic finality is often criticized as leading to the anthropic attribution of every event to a divine purpose, or superstition. For instance, "If I hadn't been at the store today, I wouldn't have found that $100 on the ground. God must have intended for me to go to the store so I would find that money." or "We won the game today because of my lucky socks." Such abuses were criticized by Francis Bacon, Descartes,  and Spinoza.

References

Causality
Teleology